Metin Topaktaş (born 15 July 1967) is a Turkish wrestler. He competed in the men's freestyle 52 kg at the 1996 Summer Olympics.

References

External links
 

1967 births
Living people
Turkish male sport wrestlers
Olympic wrestlers of Turkey
Wrestlers at the 1996 Summer Olympics
Place of birth missing (living people)